Rath Turtle Moat is a ringwork and National Monument located in County Wicklow, Ireland.

Location

History
The site is believed to derive its name from the Meic Torcaill, a leading Norse-Gaelic family in 12th-century Dublin. The site later came under Norman control. Ringworks like that at Rath Turtle were built during the earliest phase of the Norman conquest of Ireland. They usually had a wooden gate tower, with a stone-lined causewayed entrance and stone-lined banks topped by a wooden palisade.

Description
The ringwork is ovoid and consists of a raised central area enclosed by a high earthen bank, an external fosse and an external bank. The entrance is to the south has a causeway across the ditch.

References

Archaeological sites in County Wicklow
National Monuments in County Wicklow